is a Japanese restaurant chain specializing in ramen noodles. The first restaurant was opened in Kyoto by Tsutomu Kimura in 1981. As of December 2014, there are 233 branches in 38 of Japan's prefectures as well as a branch in Hawaii. The chain is often known by its short name . Tenkaippin holds a special promotion every October 1, which they call , playing off of the name of their restaurant and the calendar date.

Controversies
In October 2012, Tenkaippin was involved in a lawsuit over failure to pay a resort in Ōtsu, Shiga, for its appearance in one of their television commercials, with the resort demanding , which Tenkaippin refused to pay.

In January 2014, 18 stores across the country revealed that they had been serving Chinese-grown scallion at their restaurants rather than the "Kujo Negi" scallion native to Kyoto, and the franchisee publicly apologized for the mix-up.

References

External links
 
  

Restaurant chains in Japan
Ramen shops